The 1998 Budapest Assembly election was held on 18 October 1998, concurring with other local elections in Hungary.

Mayor 

Incumbent Gábor Demszky won against the right-wing parties' candidate János Latorcai, 58.22% - 38.97%.

Results 

List seats were distributed using the D'Hondt method.

Notes

References 

1998 in Hungary
Hungary
Local elections in Hungary
History of Budapest